is a writer and director of Japanese animation. He is the creator of titles such as Wicked City, Ninja Scroll, and Vampire Hunter D: Bloodlust.

Biography
Kawajiri was born on November 18, 1950 and grew up in Yokohama, Kanagawa Prefecture, Japan. After he graduated from high school in 1968, he worked as an animator at Mushi Production Animation until it closed in 1972. He then joined Madhouse as one of the four co-founders, and in the 1970s was promoted to animation director.  He finally debuted as a film director with 1984's Lensman: Secret of The Lens, directing jointly with the more experienced Kazuyuki Hirokawa (Kawajiri also did the character design along with Kazuo Tomizawa). Gaining an interest in darker animation, he next directed The Running Man.  Afterwards, he was instructed to make a 35-minute short based on Hideyuki Kikuchi's novels, which was released as Wicked City. After completing it, however, his producers were so impressed that he was asked to make it a feature-length film. Kawajiri enjoyed the dark tone, and agreed to manage and complete the film within a year. That same year he began to work for the Original Video Animation market debuting with "The Phoenix". From 1987 he also wrote his own scripts.

Wicked City received critical and commercial success when released in 1987, giving Kawajiri more creative freedom. He began scripting and designing his own film set in feudal Japan. The result, Ninja Scroll, about the Japanese folk hero Jubei Yagyu, was soon released. After the Western release in 1996, Kawajiri's status as a director received international recognition.  He was asked in 2002 to direct a segment, titled Program,  of The Animatrix, considered a showcase of the best directors of Japanese animation. Before The Animatrix, he also directed Vampire Hunter D: Bloodlust, which was based on a novel by Hideyuki Kikuchi.

Kawajiri directed Highlander: The Search for Vengeance. It was released on DVD on 5 June 2007. According to an interview with Ain't It Cool News with producer Galen Walker, Kawajiri disliked the fact that 7–8 minutes of added scenes with no opening exposition text sequence were removed when the film was released, but the director's cut will include the footage. Kawajiri has script approval for a sequel to Ninja Scroll, which was listed as being in pre-production with no specific release date as of 2010.

Filmography

Films
Lensman: Secret of The Lens (1984) – director, storyboard, character design, key animation
Wicked City (1987) – director, screenwriter (as Kisei Choo), character design, animation director
Neo Tokyo (1987) (Segment: "The Running Man") – director, screenwriter, character design, animation director
Demon City Shinjuku (1988) – director, character design
A Wind Named Amnesia (1990) – screenwriter, supervision
Ninja Scroll (1993) – director, screenwriter, original work, original character design
Vampire Hunter D: Bloodlust (2000) – director, screenwriter, storyboard
The Animatrix (2003) – director (Segment: "Program"), screenwriter (Segments: "World Record" and "Program")
Azumi 2: Death or Love (2005) – screenwriter
Highlander: The Search for Vengeance (2007) – director, storyboard, key animation

OVAs
The Phoenix -Space- (1987) – director
Goku: Midnight Eye (1989) – director
Cyber City Oedo 808 (1990) – director, character design
The Cockpit (1994) (Segment: "Slipstream") – director, screenwriter, character design, animation director
Biohunter (1995) – screenwriter, supervision, key animation
Birdy the Mighty (1996) – director, screenwriter, storyboard, key animation
Batman: Gotham Knight (2008) (Segment: "Deadshot") – director (uncredited)

TV series
X (2001) – director, script, storyboard
Ninja Scroll: The Series (2003) – original creator

Other work
Dororo (1969) – in-between animation
Cleopatra (1970) – in-between animation
Tomorrow's Joe (1970) – in-between animation, key animation
New Moomin (1972) – key animation
Science Ninja Team Gatchaman (1972) – key animation
Dokonjō Gaeru (1972) – key animation
Aim for the Ace! (1973) – ending Illustration, key animation
Jungle Kurobe (1973) – key animation
Samurai Giants (1973) – key animation
Judo Sanka (1974) – key animation
Hajime Ningen Gyatoruz (1974) – key animation
The Fire G-Man (1975) – key animation
Adventures of Ganba (1975) – key animation
Demon Dragon of the Heavens Gaiking (1976) – key animation
Manga Sekai Mukashi Banashi (1976) – episode director, character design, key animation, background art
Manga Nihon Mukashi Banashi (1976) – episode director, character design (uncredited), key animation, background art
Jetter Mars (1977) – key animation
Future Boy Conan (1978) – key animation
Animation Kikō Marco Polo no Bōken (1979) – storyboard, key animation
Botchan (1980) – key animation
The Fantastic Adventures of Unico (1981) – key animation, setting (assistance)
The Sea Prince and the Fire Child (1981) – key animation
The Door Into Summer (1981) – layout
Wandering Cloud (1982) – storyboard, layout, key animation (uncredited)
Unico in the Island of Magic (1983) – layout, key animation
Barefoot Gen (1983) – key animation
Harmagedon (1983) – key animation
Georgie! (1983) – opening animation
Stop!! Hibari-kun! (1983) – episode director
The Dagger of Kamui (1985) – key animation
Barefoot Gen 2 (1986) – key animation
Toki no Tabibito -Time Stranger- (1986) – key animation
Junk Boy (1987) – special CF
Bride of Deimos (1988) – key animation
Legend of the Forest (1988) – key animation
Legend of the Galactic Heroes (1988) – guest character design
Kimba the White Lion (1989) – character design
Record of Lodoss War (1990) – key animation
Zetsuai 1989 (1992) – storyboard
Phantom Quest Corp. (1994) – opening animation
Bronze: Cathexis (1994) – storyboard
Azuki-chan (1995) – character design
Memories (1995) (Segment: "Stink Bomb") – supervision, key animation
X (1996) – key animation
Todd McFarlane's Spawn (1997) – main title director
Master Keaton (1998) – screenwriter, storyboard
Pet Shop of Horrors (1999) – storyboard
Cardcaptor Sakura Movie 2: The Sealed Card (2000) – storyboard, key animation
Party 7 (2000) – key animation
Metropolis (2001) – key animation, layout (assistance)
Ogawa No Medaka (2002) – key animation
Space Pirate Captain Herlock: The Endless Odyssey (2002) – storyboard
Gokusen (2004) – storyboard
Devil May Cry: The Animated Series (2007) – key animation
Shigurui (2007) – storyboard
Redline (2009) – 1st key animation
Iron Man (2010) – storyboard
Wolverine (2011) – storyboard
The Tibetan Dog (2011) – key animation
Kaiji: Against All Rules (2011) – storyboard
X-Men (2011) – storyboard
Blade (2011) – storyboard
Chihayafuru (2011) – storyboard
Black Jack: Dezaki's Final Chapter (2011) – key animation
Btooom! (2012) – storyboard
Chihayafuru 2 (2013) – storyboard
Iron Man: Rise of Technovore (2013) – storyboard
Ace of Diamond (2014) – storyboard
Overlord (2015) - storyboard
Rokka: Braves of the Six Flowers (2015) - storyboard
One Punch Man (2015) - storyboard
Garo: Crimson Moon (2015) – storyboard
Alderamin on the Sky (2016) - storyboard
All Out!! (2016) - storyboard
ACCA: 13-Territory Inspection Dept. (2017) - storyboard
Rage of Bahamut: Virgin Soul (2017) - storyboard
Overlord II (2018) - storyboard
Mr. Tonegawa: Middle Management Blues (2018) - storyboard
Attack on Titan Season 3 Part 1 (2018) - storyboard
Boogiepop and Others (2019) - storyboard
Demon Slayer: Kimetsu no Yaiba (2019) - storyboard
No Guns Life (2019) – storyboard
Blade of the Immortal (2019) - storyboard
Chihayafuru 3 (2020) – storyboard
Deca-Dence (2020) – storyboard
Jujutsu Kaisen (2020) – storyboard
Beastars 2nd Season (2021) – storyboard
Sonny Boy (2021) – storyboard
Platinum End (2022) – storyboard
Police in a Pod (2022) – storyboard
Kin no Kuni Mizu no Kuni (2023) – storyboard

Books
 Arctic Luko (北極のルーコ). Chobunsha , 1989. 
 Vampire Hunter D: Bloodlust Storyboard Collection (川尻善昭「バンパイアハンターD」絵コンテ集). Asahi Sonorama , 2001.

References

External links 
  
 
 
 Yoshiaki Kawajiri anime at Media Arts Database 
 Filmography:Yoshiaki Kawijiri at Sakuga@Wiki(Japanese)
 Interview With Yoshiaki Kawijiri at The Animatrix Official Website

1950 births
Anime directors
Japanese animators
Japanese animated film directors
Horror film directors
Living people
Madhouse (company) people
People from Yokohama
Japanese storyboard artists